The Last Supper is a series of paintings created by the pop artist Andy Warhol (1929-1987) between 1984 and 1986 based on the famed earlier painting The Last Supper (c. 1495-1498) by Leonardo da Vinci.

They were commissioned by the Egyptian born Greek art dealer Alexander Iolas. Warhol's trip to Milan for the works debut was his last voyage out of New York City.
In 2017 in honor of the thirtieth anniversary of their Milanese debut the Museo del Novecento in Milan held an exhibition of the works.  

Some art scholars including Jessica Beck a curator at the Andy Warhol Museum in Pittsburgh have posited that they are an artistic response by Warhol to the AIDS crisis.

The paintings are discussed in depth in "Loving the Alien", the sixth and final episode of the 2022 Netflix docuseries The Andy Warhol Diaries.

References

1986 in art
Paintings by Andy Warhol
Paintings of the Last Supper